Gyulyambir is a village in the Shamkir Rayon of Azerbaijan.

It is suspected that this village has undergone a name change or no longer exists, as no Azerbaijani website mentions it under this name.

Near Gyulyambir village located Armenian Karmravank monastery, which was constructed in 751

References

 

Populated places in Shamkir District